Hugh Pugh  was a Welsh Anglican priest.

Newcombe was educated at All Souls College, Oxford. He held incumbencies at Shrivenham, Ruthin and Llandudno.

He was Archdeacon of Merioneth from 1681 until his death on 22 March 1683.

References

1683 deaths
Archdeacons of Merioneth
Alumni of All Souls College, Oxford